Avaz e Afshari (Persian:آواز افشاری) is one of the branches of Dastgah-e Shur in Persian classical music. It is cited as an independent modal system of Iranian music from the past. Afshari was noted as full of sadness. This mode has many sad and plaintive songs or pleasant ones.

Branches
This mode has some branches including:
 Daramad (preface)
 Jame daran
 Hesar
 Araq
 Hazin
 Nahib
 Rahawi
 Qara'i
 Masnavi
 Sadri

References 

Persian music
Radif (music)